My Six Loves is a 1963 comedy film in Technicolor starring Debbie Reynolds as a Broadway star who takes a vacation and finds herself responsible for six abandoned children, in Gower Champion's directorial debut. It is based on the novel of the same name by Peter Funk.

Plot
Janice Courtney is a big success on Broadway, but the busy actress collapses from exhaustion. A doctor orders her to return to her Connecticut home for a long rest.

In a shack on her property, Janice discovers six children and a large dog, abandoned and living on their own. Taking them in, Janice takes care of the kids with the help of housekeeper Ethel and a local minister, Jim Larkin. Being a mother appeals to her, but when producer Marty Bliss persuades her to resume her career, Janice returns to New York to begin a new play.

Meanwhile Janice is falling in love with the local minister, Rev, Jim Larkin.

Everything changes when one of the children (Sonny) is placed in a hospital but runs away. Jim tries to contact Janice but cannot get through Marty's reception as they have been told to ignore his calls. Eventually he storms in, in person. A frantic Janice leaves the play, and when the child is finally found, realizes that this is the life she wants, which she intends to share with Jim. Little Sonny, who has never previously spoken, confirms all with Jim's favourite term: "absolutely".

Cast
 Debbie Reynolds as Janice Courtney
 Cliff Robertson as Reverend Jim Larkin
 David Janssen as Marty Bliss
 Eileen Heckart as Ethel
 Hans Conried as Kinsley Kross
 Mary McCarty as Doreen Smith
 John McGiver as Judge Harris
 Max Showalter as B. J. Smith
 Alice Ghostley as Selena Johnson
 Alice Pearce as Bus Driver
 Pippa Scott as Dianne Soper
 Claude Stroud as Dr. Miller
 Darlene Tompkins as Darlene Smith
 Leon Belasco as Mario
 Billy E. Hughes as Leo
 Jim Backus as Sheriff
 Barry Livingston as Sherman Smith
 Colleen Peters as Amy
 Sally Smith as Brenda
 Debbie Price as Dulcie
 Teddy Eccles as Sonny
 Sterling Holloway as Oliver Dodds

See also
 List of American films of 1963

References

External links
 
 
 

1963 films
1963 comedy films
American comedy films
Films based on American novels
Films directed by Gower Champion
Films scored by Walter Scharf
Films set in Connecticut
Paramount Pictures films
1963 directorial debut films
1960s English-language films
1960s American films